Lieutenant General Frederick William "Fred" Kwasi Akuffo (21 March 1937 – 26 June 1979) was a Ghanaian soldier and politician. He was Chief of the Defence Staff of the Ghana Armed Forces from 1976 to 1978, and chairman of the ruling Supreme Military Council in Ghana from 1978 to 1979. He came to power in a military coup, and was overthrown and executed in another military coup less than a year later.

Early life and education
Fred Akuffo was born at Akropong in the Eastern Region of Ghana. He completed his secondary education in 1955 at the Presbyterian Boys' Secondary School in Odumase Krobo. He then enlisted in the Ghana Army in 1957 and trained at the Royal Military Academy, Sandhurst, UK among others, receiving his commission in 1960. He was married to Mrs. Emily Akuffo. He also attended the National Defence College in India in 1973.

Career
While in the army, he served as commanding officer of the Airborne Training School at Tamale and later the 6th Battalion of Infantry of the Ghana Army between 1969 and 1970. He rose to become the 2nd Brigade Commander. He supervised the change over of traffic flow in Ghana from driving on the left to driving on the right as part of 'Operation Keep Right' which was effected on 4 August 1974. This changeover was successful and largely accident free. He rose to become the Army Commander in April 1974 and Chief of the Defence Staff in April 1976.

Politics
On October 9, 1975, Fred Akuffo was appointed a member of the ruling Supreme Military Council government due to his position as Ghana's army commander. On July 5, 1978, he led a palace coup to overthrow the head of state, General Ignatius Acheampong. He continued with the ongoing preparations to return Ghana to constitutional rule but his government was also cut short on 4 June 1979 by a military uprising by the junior ranks of the Ghana military led by Flight Lieutenant Jerry John Rawlings and the Armed Forces Revolutionary Council (AFRC).

Execution
He was executed along with other senior military officers on 26 June 1979 at the Teshie Military Range, Ghana.

References

External links
Ghana government official website for the celebration of Ghana's 50th anniversary

See also

1937 births
1979 deaths
Executed Ghanaian people
Executed military personnel
Executed presidents
Defence ministers of Ghana
Ghanaian soldiers
Graduates of the Royal Military Academy Sandhurst
Leaders ousted by a coup
Leaders who took power by coup
People executed by Ghana by firing squad
Heads of state of Ghana
Chiefs of Army Staff (Ghana)
Presbyterian Boys' Senior High School alumni
Ghanaian Presbyterians
National Defence College, India alumni